Ja'mie: Private School Girl is an Australian television sitcom miniseries. It is set at an exclusive private girls' grammar school in Sydney's very wealthy North Shore district. It is written by and stars male comedian Chris Lilley. Continuing the mockumentary style of Lilley's previous series, Ja'mie: Private School Girl follows Ja'mie King, a character who previously appeared in Lilley's series We Can Be Heroes and Summer Heights High, during her final weeks of high school.

The series is co-produced by Chris Lilley and Princess Pictures in association with ABC and HBO.

The Australia Broadcasting Corporation (ABC) broadcast the show in Australia from 23 October to 27 November 2013. HBO began broadcasting the show in the United States on 24 November 2013.

Development
Lilley announced that he was working on a new show on his Facebook page. The ABC confirmed that Lilley's six-part half-hour comedy series would screen in 2013. On 8 September 2013, Lilley revealed the title of the show and that the returning character to the series is Ja'mie King.

Production 
Melbourne-based production company Princess Pictures and Chris Lilley produced the series with Australian Broadcasting Corporation and HBO. The show was shot at Haileybury College, Melbourne.

Broadcast and reception
Private School Girl debuted on ABC1 in Australia on 23 October 2013, and on HBO in North America on 24 November 2013. BBC Three began broadcasting the series in the UK on 6 February 2014 at 10pm.

Viewing figures on ABC were initially high at 924,000 viewers, but had dropped to 575,000 by the fourth episode. The series was, however, a success on ABC iview, beating earlier records set by Doctor Who.

Critical reaction has been mixed for the series. Laurence Barber of The Guardian blamed a lack of character development for its drop in popularity in Australia, believing "Lilley has made it almost impossible for us to care." Reviewing the shows broadcast on HBO, Tim Goodman of The Hollywood Reporter criticised the transition from sketch to series saying: "You'd have to be the biggest of Ja'mie fans to want to watch her talking nonstop for 30 minutes." After the show's premiere in the United Kingdom, Rebecca Smith of The Daily Telegraph praised the comedy of the first episode as well as Lilley's performance, yet believed it was "in danger of becoming one-dimensional."

Characters

Ja'mie King

Ja'mie King, portrayed by Chris Lilley, is the main character of the show. She was also a main character in two of Lilley's previous shows, We Can Be Heroes and Summer Heights High. Ja'mie: Private School Girl follows Ja'mie in her final year of school, having left Summer Heights High and returned to Hillford Girls Grammar School.

Mitchell
Mitchell Ward, portrayed by Lester Ellis Jr., is Ja'mie's love interest. A new Year 10 student on a rugby scholarship who Ja'mie calls "totally quiche", at the boys' school Kelton Boys Grammar down the road.

Prefects
The Prefects are Ja'mie's friend group at school and the most popular clique at Hilford. They are self-described as the quichest girls at the school, "quiche" being a term made up by Ja'mie herself, meaning "a step above hot". All the girls are expelled at the end of episode 6 after they give a raunchy performance at the Hilford Presentation evening. They all enroll with Ja'mie at Blaxland College, shown in the 6-month skip.

 Madison Cartwright portrayed by Georgie Jennings; The most perfect prefect, is Ja'mie's best friend until episode 4. She falls out with her after Ja'mie learns she spent a free period with Mitchell which also led to a break-up between him and Ja'mie. Ja'mie tries to take back her prefect status and the two engage in a cat fight. In episode 5, she and Ja'mie make up after Mitchell sends a dick pic to Ja'mie and she lies to Madison about all these horrible things Mitchell said about her, leading to her dumping him.
 Olivia Harrington portrayed by Georgia Treu
 Imogen "Immy" Gallagher portrayed by Laura Grady
 Morgan Courtier portrayed by Phoebe Roberts
 Alexandria "Alex" Lupinski portrayed by D'arci Buckerfield
 Isabella "Bella" Mansouri portrayed by Tayla Duyal

Courtney
Courtney, portrayed by Madelyn Warrell, is Ja'mie's younger sister who also attends Hilford. She is the subject of a lot of Ja'mie's abuse, particularly over her singing in the school choir. She and her friend Selena (Thi Reynolds) film Ja'mie's risqué dance performance with Mitchell.

Cody
Cody Bomhoff, portrayed by Alex Cooper, is Ja'mie's "GBF" (Gay Best Friend). He attends Kelton Boys Grammar and is the first to inform Ja'mie about the arrival of Mitchell. He takes dance class at Hilford with Ja'mie due to Kelton not having a class. He is responsible for Ja'mie's rebel makeover in episode 5 and he also accompanies her to visit Kwami for the last time.

Other characters
 Jhyll King, portrayed by Jhyll Teplin, is Ja'mie's mother (previously seen in We Can Be Heroes and Summer Heights High). She is still abused regularly by Ja'mie. 
 Marcus King, portrayed by Brad Brivik, is Ja'mie's father who she often manipulates for her own gain. Ja'mie and her father have a very strange relationship.
 Mandy Bryant, portrayed by Monique Max, is Marcus' assistant who Ja'mie likes due to her being young and agreeing with Ja'mie's idea for a party. It's implied that Marcus is having an affair with her.
 Mr. Hayes, portrayed by Wayne Perkins, is the deputy principal of Hilford Girls Grammar. He may appear blind to Ja'mie ongoing nastiness however he isn't always completely oblivious. After threatening to expel Ja'mie in episode 5, he finally does so at the end of episode 6. After stopping Ja'mie's rant about the Hillford Medal, he is forced to intervene when Ja'mie plays the video of her and Kwami. He and Ms. Whelan expel Ja'mie and the Prefects.
 Lauren Nikolov, portrayed by Rose Flanagan is one of the "Boarders", a group of girls that Ja'mie refers to as fat girls and lesbians. She and Ja'mie have a mutual dislike of each other. In episode 3 she turns up at Ja'mie's party, and when denied access, insists that Ja'mie is fat herself causing her to have a brief meltdown.
 Erin Walker, portrayed by Brodie Dare, is another "Boarder". She is in Ja'mie's dance class and like Ja'mie she does charity work, a fact Ja'mie resents. In episode 5 it is revealed that she has won the Hilford medal causing Ja'mie much distress. In episode 6, she wins the medal and performs her dance at Speech Night, much to Ja'mie's disgust. It is mentioned after the 6-month skip that Erin has a boyfriend and she is supposedly getting married so she can have sex, due to her Christian values.
 Kwami Onwuatuegwu, portrayed by Albert Mambo, is a Ugandan boy who Ja'mie Skype-chats with every night. In episode 2 he sends a photo of his penis to Ja'mie. He moves in with the Kings in episode 3 and attends Ja'mie's party. In episode 5 he is kicked out of the King's home after Mr King discovers that he was showing his penis on Skype to Ja'mie as she was showing him her breasts. Ja'mie later visits him to explain why he was kicked out, revealing that she only used him to help her cause for the Hilford Medal. He claims that he loves her, however she rejects him and leaves. In episode 6, Ja'mie shows the video of her and Kwami at the Speech Night leading to her being expelled.
 Astrid O'Hara is Ja'mie's girlfriend. After Ja'mie gets expelled from Hilford Girls Grammar she starts going to a new school Blaxland College and goes through her "bisexual phase", and it is shown that Ja'mie often starts fights with Astrid and threatens to break up with her.
 Brianna, portrayed by Emma Clapham, was best friends with Ja'mie in We Can Be Heroes and Summer Heights High. Ja'mie states that she is no longer her friend because she became 'fat' and 'sorta indie'. In episode 5, Madison begins to hang out with her and her friends after she argued with the Prefects.
Emma, portrayed by Sharley White, is a part of Ja'mie's former best friend group. Even though Ja'mie no longer hangs out with them in this season, Madison soon joins the group to get revenge.
Mel, played by Alice Stewart, like Emma is a part of Ja'mie's ex-friends group. Madison also befriends Mel to get back at Ja'mie.

Episodes

Awards and nominations

Home video releases

References

External links

 
 

2013 Australian television series debuts
2013 Australian television series endings
2010s Australian comedy television series
2010s high school television series
2010s satirical television series
2010s teen sitcoms
2000s Australian television miniseries
Australian Broadcasting Corporation original programming
Australian high school television series
Australian mockumentary television series
Australian satirical television shows
Australian television sitcoms
Australian television spin-offs
Cross-dressing in television
English-language television shows
HBO original programming
Narcissism in television
Television series about teenagers
Television shows set in Sydney